Trebah (meaning Gorabo's farm) is a  sub-tropical garden situated in Cornwall, England, UK, near Glendurgan Garden and above the Helford River. Part of the parish of Mawnan, the gardens are set within an area of the same name, which includes the small settlements of Trebah Wartha and Trebah Woolas (both are of medieval origin).

History of Trebah
In 1831 Trebah was acquired by the Fox family who built Glendurgan Garden. Trebah was first laid out as a pleasure garden by Charles Fox, a Quaker polymath of enormous creative energy who paid meticulous attention to the exact positioning of every tree. His son-in-law, Edmund Backhouse, M.P. for Darlington, took the work further.

The Hexts
In 1907 Trebah was bought by Charles Hawkins Hext and inherited on his death in 1917 by his wife, Alice, who died in 1939. From 1939 to 1981 the garden fell into decline, since the substantial Trebah Estate was sold off in small packages, of which the house and garden was one.

Second World War and after
During the Second World War, Trebah was used for military purposes and the assault on Omaha Beach in Normandy was launched from Polgwidden Beach, at the foot of Trebah Garden.

One of the subsequent owners was Donald Healey, the motor car designer, who removed some of the concrete military structures and provided a boathouse on the beach.

Development of the garden by the Hibberts
In 1981, on their 64th birthday, Tony Hibbert and Eira Hibbert bought Trebah as their retirement home. They were persuaded to give up the first three years of retirement to restore the garden.

Indeed, when Major Hibbert agreed to three years, little did he know it would become a quarter century. The decision, he eventually wrote, "has given us the happiest twenty-four years of our lives and had we not taken up the challenge we'd have been dead long ago of gin poisoning and boredom."

The Trust
The garden was opened to the public in 1987 and by 1989 visitor numbers had reached 36,000. The Hibbert family then gave the house, garden and cottages to the Trebah Garden Trust, a registered charity, to ensure that the garden could be preserved for future generations.

In 2000 visitor numbers had exceeded 105,000 and a £1.94 million grant from the Heritage Lottery Fund and Objective One allowed Trebah to build the new 'Hibbert Centre', to rebuild Alice Hext's seat, restore the nursery and carry out major landscaping and garden improvements.

Views from Trebah

References

External links 
 Official Trebah website
"Trebah My Story"—Major Hibberts Log (as captured by Internet Archive Wayback Machine 20 Aug 2011)
Index
Page 1:  Foreword
Page 7:  The Backhouses 1860 to 1906
Page 10:  The Fallow Years 1939 to 1981
Page 12:  The Hibberts 1981 to 2002
Page 13:  The Hibberts 1981 to 2002
Page 16:  Hibbert and Bradshaw Families, The Bradshaws
Page 17:  Hibbert and Bradshaw Families, The Hibberts
Page 18:  Hibbert and Bradshaw Families
Page 19:  A Declaration of Wishes
Page 20:  A Declaration of Wishes
Page 21:  Laughter in the Garden
Page 27:  Acknowledgements

Gardens in Cornwall
Botanical gardens in Cornwall
Operation Overlord
Fox family of Falmouth
Mawnan